The , also known as the  is a proposed 3.1 km railway line in the city of Ota, Tokyo, Japan, connecting the Tōkyū Tamagawa Line (which currently terminates at Kamata Station) to the Keikyū Airport Line (which currently terminates at Keikyū Kamata Station). One envisioned purpose of the line is to carry Haneda traffic to and from central Tokyo stations such as Ikebukuro and Shibuya via the Tokyu network and the Tokyo Metro Fukutoshin Line.

Design and configuration 
The new line is designed to branch off from the Tokyu Tamagawa Line near Yaguchinowatashi Station, and from there enter a 1.7 km tunnel which would include new underground stations at Kamata and Keikyu Kamata. The line would emerge from the tunnel past Keikyu Kamata to join the Keikyu Airport Line between Kojiya Station and Otorii Station.

History 
The Kamata district's two major train stations, Kamata and Keikyu Kamata, are located 800 meters apart, and a transfer between the stations requires a 10-minute walk. Ota City has had plans to connect the stations since 1982, but profitability and connectivity to Haneda Airport were major issues that delayed the project for years.

One major issue with the project is that there is a difference in track gauge between the Tokyu Tamagawa Line, which uses 3 ft 6 in gauge, and the Keikyu Airport Line, which uses standard gauge. Ota City's proposal to address this issue called for the line to initially terminate at Keikyu Kamata, allowing same-station transfers between Tokyu and Keikyu trains at Kamata, and then to eventually offer through service to the Airport Line either by using Gauge Change Trains or by upgrading the Airport Line to dual gauge.

Although the Tokyo metropolitan government indicated skepticism about the need for the line, Ota has promoted its construction to national government officials. A study released by Ota in December 2015 estimated the economic impact of the line at around 239 billion yen, of which construction impact would account for around 184 billion yen and passenger consumption impact would account for around 54 billion yen.

The Ota and Tokyo governments agreed in 2022 to divide the cost of the line, aiming to commence operation in 2035. As of 2022, the estimated project cost was 136 billion yen, and it was projected that the line would turn a profit after 17 years of operation. A third sector operating company, Haneda Airport Line, was founded in October 2022 with investment from Ota City and Tokyu.

References

Airport rail links in Japan
Haneda Airport
Proposed railway lines in Japan
Railway lines in Tokyo